Narathiwat can refer to
the town Narathiwat
the Narathiwat Province
Amphoe Mueang Narathiwat, the district around Narathiwat town
Narathiwat Airport